The Secret Theatre is an Off-Off-Broadway theatre that was established in The Long Island City Art Center in July 2007 by Actor/Director Richard Mazda.  It can seat slightly under fifty audience members.  The theatre is making a well-earned reputation as a home for The Queens Players and also through its 'repertory' style policy of mounting an average of over 9 mainstage productions in a year. The inaugural production featured an original work by Joel Schatzky which starred Bill Krakauer father of noted Klezmer musician David Krakauer. Bill is an 80-year-old psychotherapist turned actor who took on the challenging lead role of a conductor who escaped persecution by the Nazis by emigrating to America to pursue a musical career. Subsequent productions in The Secret Theatre's first season included 'Theatre of Horror', a mainstage production featuring original plays from the Grand Guignol, A Christmas Carol, Lysistrata and Edward II by Christopher Marlowe. 

The production of Edward II was filmed and is currently in post production.

References

 Sheward, David Backstage Review of 'Atonement' published September 7, 2007
 Murray, Christopher Backstage.com Review of 'Home James'  published November 19, 2007
 Cassidy, Nat nytheatre.com Review of Edward II published April 10, 2008
 D. J. R. Bruckner, STAGE: 'VAMPIRE LESBIANS OF SODOM' New York Times Theater Review - June 20, 1985 (retrieved 2008-04-29)

External links
 The Secret Theatre
 Charles Busch's website

Off-Off-Broadway